Ceresole may refer to:

Ceresole Alba, a municipality in the Province of Cuneo, Piedmont, Italy
Ceresole Reale, a municipality in the Province of Turin, Piedmont, Italy
Battle of Ceresole (1544) at Ceresole Alba

See also
Paul Cérésole (1832-1905), member of the Swiss Federal Council (1870-1875)
Pierre Cérésole (1879-1945), Swiss pacifist
Norberto Ceresole (1943-2003), Argentine sociologist